La Paloma Glacier is a glacier located some  northeast of Santiago. It one of the largest glaciers of central Chile.

Glaciers of Chile
Landforms of Santiago Metropolitan Region